Burchardia umbellata, known as milkmaids, is a perennial herbaceous plant native to woodlands and heath of eastern and southern Australia. It is known in all states. It typically flowers from September until November, in dry sclerophyll forests.

Size and shape
The narrow leaves of Burchardia umbellata are up to 60 cm long by 1.5 to 4 mm wide. Clusters of white or pale pink flowers with reddish centers sit atop a thin stalk that is 50 to 60 cm high. Each flower measures about 2.5 cm wide. There is a cluster of up to ten carrot-shaped tubers at the base, each about 5 mm thick.

Use as food
Aboriginals eat the potato-like tubers. The tubers can be eaten raw or cooked. They are white, fleshy, crisp, and starchy, with a nondescript flavor.

Origin of name
The genus Burchardia is named for German botanist Johann Heinrich Burckhardt. The Latin species name umbellata means "umbrella" or "parasol", referring to the shape of the umbels of flowers.

Cultivation
Burchardia umbellata is rarely available in nurseries, but it can be propagated by seed and kept in containers. It requires moist, well-drained soils and sun or light shade.

References

Bushfood
Colchicaceae
Monocots of Australia
Flora of New South Wales
Flora of Queensland
Flora of South Australia
Flora of Tasmania
Flora of Victoria (Australia)
Angiosperms of Western Australia
Root vegetables